Auguste Renaud (October 18, 1835 – July 7, 1897) was a New Brunswick farmer and political figure. He represented Kent in the 1st Canadian Parliament as a Liberal member and was the first Acadian elected to the House of Commons.

He was born in Bordeaux, France in 1835 and settled near Bouctouche, New Brunswick around 1850. In 1862, he married Cécile Léger. After his term in office, he served as customs collector at Bouctouche until 1891. He died in Fond-de-la-Baie near Bouctouche in 1897.

Renaud was the first francophone from the Maritimes to sit in the House of Commons.

Electoral record

References 

1835 births
1897 deaths
Liberal Party of Canada MPs
Members of the House of Commons of Canada from New Brunswick
French emigrants to Canada